The governor of Wisconsin is the head of government of Wisconsin and the commander-in-chief of the state's army and air forces. The governor has a duty to enforce state laws, and the power to either approve or veto bills passed by the Wisconsin Legislature, to convene the legislature, and to grant pardons, except in cases of treason and impeachment. The position was first filled by Nelson Dewey on June 7, 1848, the year Wisconsin became a state. Prior to statehood, there were four governors of Wisconsin Territory.

The 46th, and current governor is Tony Evers, a Democrat who took office on January 7, 2019.

Powers
The governor of Wisconsin has both inherent powers granted by the U.S. Constitution and administrative powers granted by laws passed by the Wisconsin State Legislature.

Constitutional powers
The constitutional powers of the governor of Wisconsin are outlined in the Wisconsin Constitution at Article V, Section 4. In general, the governor ensures that the laws of Wisconsin are carried out.

Veto power
The governor of Wisconsin has the strongest veto power of nearly any American governor. Any bill passed by the Wisconsin State Legislature must be presented to the governor, who either signs it into law, or vetoes it.  In the event of a veto, the bill is returned to the legislature, who may then vote to override the veto.  In 1930, the Wisconsin Constitution was amended to give the governor line-item veto power, which allows portions of appropriations bills to be struck out without rejecting the entire bill. Governors have the power to strike out words, numbers, and even entire sentences from bills. The partial veto may still be overridden by the legislature. 

In 1990 a further amendment specified that the line-item veto does not give the governor power to veto individual letters of appropriations bills, thereby forming new words. Despite this 1990 law, the strength of the governor's veto power gave rise to the term "Frankenstein veto" to describe the governor's ability to form a new bill that subverts the intent of the legislature. The Wisconsin Supreme Court will determine if the veto power should be further limited in 2019.

Other constitutional powers
The governor is the commander-in-chief of the state's militia.  If it is deemed necessary, the governor may also convene extraordinary sessions of the state legislature; and may convene them anywhere in the state, if Madison, the state capital, is deemed unfit for the purpose due to invasion or contagious disease.

The governor may pardon, commute, or grant reprieve of sentences, except in cases of treason or impeachment. The governor must notify the Wisconsin State Legislature of these each year, along with the reasons for them.  In cases of treason, the governor may suspend the carrying out of the sentence until the next session of the legislature, who then vote to grant a pardon, commutation or reprieve, or to carry out the sentence.

The governor must also "communicate to the legislature, at every session, the condition of the state, and recommend such matters to them for their consideration as he may deem expedient" (these annual communications are referred to as the "state of the state").

Administrative and budgetary powers
The governor of Wisconsin, as head of the executive branch, also has administrative powers (the power to administer agencies created by the Wisconsin legislature). Since 1965, there has been an increase in executive orders to "establish standards and provide uniformity to executive agency operations and programs." However, since 2011, the Wisconsin Legislature has attempted to limit the authority of administrative agencies.

The governor also appoints heads of agencies created by the legislature. This appointment power is not explicitly granted by the Wisconsin Constitution, as it is in the appointments clause of the federal constitution, with the exception of appointing judicial vacancies. Instead, the governor appoints heads of agencies by statute. The governor of Wisconsin had 307 executive appointments between 2017 and 2018.

State law requires the governor to prepare an executive budget bill. This helps the governor "to pursue a legislative agenda".

Elections and term of office
The governor of Wisconsin is directly elected—the candidate with the most votes becomes governor.  If two candidates receive an equal number of votes, which is higher than that received by any other candidate, the members of the state legislature vote between the two at their next session.

Under the original Wisconsin Constitution, governors were elected for a term of two years; in 1967, the constitution was amended to increase the term of office to four years, beginning with the governor elected in the 1970 election.  There is no limit to the number of terms a governor may hold. The longest-serving governor was Tommy Thompson, from January 5, 1987, until February 1, 2001, a total of 14 years and 28 days; the shortest-serving was Arthur MacArthur, Sr., from March 21, 1856, until March 25 of the same year; a total of 5 days.

Candidates for the office must be citizens of the United States and qualified voters in the state of Wisconsin.

Removal
The governor usually leaves office because their term ends and they have not been re-elected. But the governor may also leave office through other means. For example, the governor may resign from office. Four governors have resigned: William Barstow due to fraud allegations, Robert La Follette, Sr. to take his seat in the United States Senate, Patrick Joseph Lucey to become Ambassador to Mexico, and Tommy Thompson to become United States Secretary of Health and Human Services.  Additionally two governors—Louis Harvey and Walter Samuel Goodland—died while in office, and Orland Loomis, who was elected governor, died before taking office.

The governor can also be removed through an impeachment trial or through a recall election.  An impeachment trial is carried out by the Wisconsin State Assembly, if a majority of its members agree to the impeachment. No governors have been removed from office through impeachment in the history of Wisconsin. However, Arthur MacArthur, Sr., who, as lieutenant governor, became acting governor upon the resignation of William Barstow in 1856, was removed after the Wisconsin Supreme Court ruled that Barstow's opponent in the previous election, Coles Bashford, was the election's legitimate winner. 

In 2012, Scott Walker became the only governor in Wisconsin history to face a recall election and was the only governor in American history to survive a recall election until Gavin Newsom also survived in the 2021 California gubernatorial recall election. He retained his seat, defeating Milwaukee mayor Tom Barrett by seven percentage points, a margin one point greater than that of the 2010 election, becoming the first governor in American history to survive a recall attempt.

Election history

In the most recent gubernatorial election in Wisconsin, over 1.3 million voters cast ballots for governor. This was the highest turnout in Wisconsin voting history, with the exception of the 2012 recall election. There have been 44 governors of Wisconsin and 45 individual governorships. 1 governor, Philip La Follette, served non-consecutive terms. Four parties have had their candidates elected governor: the Democratic, the Whig, the Republican and the Progressive.

Relationship with the  lieutenant governor of Wisconsin
Originally, the state constitution specified that the governor and lieutenant governor of Wisconsin were voted upon separately, but in 1967, the constitution was amended to state that they were elected together.  Prior to this amendment, there were nine incidents in which the elected governor and lieutenant governor were not of the same political party.

Originally, the state constitution only said that in the event of the impeachment, removal from office, death, resignation or absence of the governor, or in the event of the governor being unfit to serve due to illness, "the powers and duties of the office shall devolve upon the lieutenant governor" for the remainder of the term or until the governor is able to return to office.  In 1979, the constitution was amended to specify that in the event of the governor's death, resignation or removal from office, the lieutenant governor becomes governor for the remainder of the term, but in the event of impeachment, incapacitation or absence, the lieutenant governor merely becomes "acting governor" until the governor can return to his duties.  The original constitution also specified that in any of the aforementioned events the secretary of state would become governor if the lieutenant governorship was vacant, but after 1979 this provision, too, was amended to distinguish between "governor" and "acting governor."

Succession

References
General

Specific

External links
Office of the Governor

1848 establishments in Wisconsin